The Cinq Isles Formation is a formation cropping out in Newfoundland.

References

Devonian Newfoundland and Labrador